Elsa de Guadalupe Conde Rodríguez (born 20 February 1962) is a Mexican politician from the Social Democratic Party. From 2006 to 2009 she served as Deputy of the LX Legislature of the Mexican Congress representing the State of Mexico.

References

1962 births
Living people
Politicians from the State of Mexico
Women members of the Chamber of Deputies (Mexico)
Social Democratic Party (Mexico) politicians
21st-century Mexican politicians
21st-century Mexican women politicians
Deputies of the LX Legislature of Mexico
Members of the Chamber of Deputies (Mexico) for the State of Mexico